The 1970–71 Iraq Central FA Premier League was the 23rd season of the Iraq Central FA League (the top division of football in Baghdad and its neighbouring cities from 1948 to 1973). Eight teams competed in the tournament, which was played in a double round-robin format.

After returning from the 1971 Asian Champion Club Tournament, Aliyat Al-Shorta had two games in hand against Al-Mushat and Al-Sikak Al-Hadeed and if they won both games they would win the league. Al-Sikak Al-Hadeed managed to go 2–0 up in the first half through two goals from Ali Kadhim. Aliyat Al-Shorta then scored twice in the last ten minutes through Douglas Aziz and Tariq Aziz but the game ended 2–2, giving Maslahat Naqil Al-Rukab their fourth league title.

Aliyat Al-Shorta's 5–0 win over Al-Quwa Al-Siyara during the second half of the season was annulled by the Iraq Central Football Association due to suspicions of match fixing. Al-Quwa Al-Siyara were relegated as punishment, while Aliyat Al-Shorta, who denied any wrongdoing, missed out on two points that would have won them the title.

League table

Known results

References

External links
 Iraqi Football Website

Iraq Central FA League seasons
Iraq
League